Anca Andreiu (born 18 August 1951) is a Romanian former backstroke swimmer. She competed in two events at the 1968 Summer Olympics.

References

External links
 

1951 births
Living people
Romanian female backstroke swimmers
Olympic swimmers of Romania
Swimmers at the 1968 Summer Olympics
Sportspeople from Reșița